Nicholas van der Nat is a South African chess player.

He has the titles of FIDE Master and FIDE Trainer.
He has won the South African Closed Chess Championships three times, in 2000, 2005, and 2009, and was the best South African participant in the South African Open in 2009 and 2011.
He coaches chess on a full-time basis.
He has started and currently runs Chess Excellence, a Chess coaching and competition organisation based in Johannesburg.

References

South African chess players
Chess FIDE Masters
Living people
1979 births
People from Kimberley, Northern Cape